The Letra del año (Spanish) or Letra do Ano (Portuguese) (English: Letter of the year) is an annual proclamation of predictions and advice by babalawo's for the coming year, usually issued every December 31 (New Year's Eve on the Gregorian calendar). In Yorubaland, it is made by a council of babalawo's during the Odun Ifa (New Year) festival during June. In most of Latin America, a national council of babalawo's is usually responsible for the announcements of predictions. In Cuba, however, at least two national councils (one of which is state-sponsored) offer letras del año. A particular controversy arose in 2009-2010, when one of the Cuban national councils of babalawo issued a letra which predicted fights for power and an unusually high number of deaths of political leaders in the world, which many media outlets outside Cuba interpreted as being directed to Cuba's own political apparatus.

Some well known babalawo councils

Cuba
 Cuban Council of Great Priests of Ifá
 Miguel Febles Padrón Commission Organized for the Reading of the Year

United States
 Tata Gaitan Commission Organized for the Reading of the Year
 Council of Babalawos of California

Puerto Rico
 Temple Yoruba Omó Orisha
 Yoruba Afro-Caribbean Orisha Ayé Association

Venezuela
 Civil Cultural Association of Priests of Ifá

Panama
 Ilé Ifá Ifá Lola Alfonso Díaz
 Ilé Ifá Gerardo Carrillo

Mexico
 Yoruba Society of Mexico

Spain
 Ilé Iré Esulona

Brazil
 Associação Ifá Ni L'Órun

France
 Yoruba Cultural Association of Cuba in France

References

External links
 Letra del Año 2011, Predicciones de Ifá 2011, Proyecto Orunmila 
 Historia de Letra Letra del Año, por Adalberto Herrera (ASOIFA VZLA)

Yoruba mythology
Santería
Divination
New Year celebrations